The 1957 Colorado Buffaloes football team was an American football team that represented the University of Colorado in the Big Seven Conference during the 1957 NCAA University Division football season. Led by tenth-year head coach Dallas Ward, the Buffaloes compiled an overall record of 6–3–1 with a mark of 3–3 in conference play, tying for third place in the Big 7. The team played its home games on campus at Folsom Field in Boulder, Colorado.

Schedule

References

Colorado
Colorado Buffaloes football seasons
Colorado Buffaloes football